Francis Woods (January 27, 1822 – September 18, 1894) was a businessman and political figure in New Brunswick, Canada. He represented Queen's County in the Legislative Assembly of New Brunswick from 1874 to 1882 as a Liberal member.

He was born near Enniskillen in County Fermanagh, Ireland, the son of Anthony Woods, and moved to New Brunswick with his parents and grandparents around 1829. In 1852, he married Jane Elizabeth Armstrong. Woods was president of the Gagetown and Petersville Railway.

References 
 The Canadian parliamentary companion and annual register, 1879, CH Mackintosh
 The Irish In Early New Brunswick, Irish Canadian Cultural Association of New Brunswick

1819 births
1894 deaths
New Brunswick Liberal Association MLAs
Irish emigrants to pre-Confederation New Brunswick